The 2022–23 ICC Men's T20 World Cup Africa Qualifier is a Twenty20 International (T20I) cricket tournament being played as part of qualification process for the 2024 ICC Men's T20 World Cup, starting from November 2022.

The first stage of the qualification pathway in the Africa region consisted of two sub-regional qualifiers, with the top two teams from each event progressing to the regional final. The sub-regional tournaments were played from 17 November to 9 December 2022, hosted by the Rwanda Cricket Association. The regional finals will be played in Namibia in 2023. The top two sides in the regional final events will qualify for the 2024 ICC Men's T20 World Cup.

Kenya were the clear favourites going into Qualifier A, while Mali and Saint Helena played their first T20I matches at the event. Kenya and Rwanda progressed from Qualifier A after finishing top of the round-robin tournament. Rwanda's win over Malawi proved to be decisive, in what was one of the several matches affected by rain. Malawi's Sami Sohail was named player of the series, Rwanda's Eric Dusingizimana and Kenya's Collins Obuya shared the best batsman award, Botswana's Dhruv Maisuria and Rwanda's Emmanuel Sebareme shared the bowling award and Orchide Tuyisenge was named as best fielder.

Gambia played their first matches with T20I status during Qualifier B. Tanzania won Qualifier B and runners-up Nigeria claimed the remaining place at the regional final. Mozambique's Jose Bulele was named player of the series, Ghana's Samson Awiah was named best batsman, Tanzania's Yalinde Nkanya was named best bowler, and the best fielder award went to Tanzania's Kassim Nassoro.

Teams

Preparation

Sub-regional qualifiers
Seven of the participating teams (Botswana, Cameroon, Ghana, Kenya, Malawi, Mozambique, Tanzania) played in the 2022 ACA Africa T20 Cup Finals at Willowmore Park, Benoni, in September.

Mali selected their players through the 11th edition of their National Championship in September. Gambia selected 27 players for national trials out of the best performing players in their eight-team domestic tournament held from May to October. Botswana played a five-match bilateral series against a Tuskers select team from 22 to 27 October in Bulawayo. Kenya organized the inaugural Swaminarayan Pro20 tournament from 29 October to 12 November, which was their first franchise event since East Africa Cup in 2013. Sierra Leone played six inter-squad trial matches to prepare for the tournament. Tanzania hosted a bilateral T20I series against Rwanda from 31 October to 6 November at the Annadil Burhani Ground in Dar es Salaam, which the hosts won 5–0. Saint Helena prepared with a training camp in South Africa ahead of the qualifiers. Nigeria played a four-match bilateral series against a Rhinos select team from 24 to 27 November at Kwekwe Sports Club during a preparation camp in Zimbabwe.

Qualifier A

Squads

Points table

 Advanced to the regional final

Fixtures

Qualifier B

Squads

Points table

 Advanced to the regional final

Fixtures

Regional Final

 Advance to the 2024 ICC Men's T20 World Cup

References

External links
 Series home at ESPNcricinfo (Qualifier A)
 Series home at ESPNcricinfo (Qualifier B)

Associate international cricket competitions in 2022–23
Qualifier
ICC Men's T20 World Cup Africa Qualifier
ICC Men's T20 World Cup Africa Qualifier